Rabelais is a crater on Mercury. Its name was adopted by the International Astronomical Union (IAU) in 1976. Rabelais is named for the French writer François Rabelais.

The crater Ma Chih-Yuan is to the west of Rabelais, Coleridge is to the north, and Khansa is to the east.  

The scarps of Adventure Rupes are to the south.  A scarp that is informally named Rabelais Dorsum cuts across Adventure Rupes.

References

Impact craters on Mercury